Sneaky Sound System are a Sydney-based Australian dance music group.

Sneaky Sound System may also refer to:

 Sneaky Sound System (2006 album), their debut album
 Sneaky Sound System (2009 album), their second UK compilation album